The Bellmawr School District is a community public school district that serves students in pre-kindergarten through eighth grade from Bellmawr, in Camden County, New Jersey, United States.

As of the 2019–20 school year, the district, comprised of three schools, had an enrollment of 1,225 students and 99.5 classroom teachers (on an FTE basis), for a student–teacher ratio of 12.3:1.

The district is classified by the New Jersey Department of Education as being in District Factor Group "B", the second lowest of eight groupings. District Factor Groups organize districts statewide to allow comparison by common socioeconomic characteristics of the local districts. From lowest socioeconomic status to highest, the categories are A, B, CD, DE, FG, GH, I and J.

For ninth through twelfth grades, public-school students attend Triton Regional High School in neighboring Runnemede, one of three high schools that are part of the Black Horse Pike Regional School District. The other communities in the district are Gloucester Township and Runnemede. As of the 2019–20 school year, the high school had an enrollment of 1,154 students and 91.4 classroom teachers (on an FTE basis), for a student–teacher ratio of 12.6:1. The two other schools in the district are Highland Regional High School and Timber Creek Regional High School, which serve students from Gloucester Township, based on their address.

Schools
Schools in the district (with 2019–20 enrollment data from the National Center for Education Statistics) are:
Elementary schools
Bellmawr Park Elementary School with 476 students in grades PreK-4
Gina Heller, Principal
Ethel M. Burke Elementary School with 248 students in grades K-4
Frank Jankowski, Principal
Middle school
Bell Oaks Upper Elementary School with 484 students in grades 5-8
Anthony Farinelli, Principal

Administration
Core members of the district's administration are:
Danielle Sochor, Superintendent
Patrick Doyle, Business Administrator / Board Secretary

Board of education
The district's board of education is comprised of seven members who set policy and oversee the fiscal and educational operation of the district through its administration. As a Type II school district, the board's trustees are elected directly by voters to serve three-year terms of office on a staggered basis, with either two three seats up for election each year held (since 2012) as part of the November general election. The board appoints a superintendent to oversee the day-to-day operation of the district.

References

External links
Bellmawr School District

School Data for the Bellmawr School District, National Center for Education Statistics
Black Horse Pike Regional School District

Bellmawr, New Jersey
New Jersey District Factor Group B
School districts in Camden County, New Jersey